Cherokee Generating Station is a natural gas-fired power plant in Adams County, Colorado, about  north of downtown Denver. It is the largest in Adams County, and the second-largest natural-gas fired plant in the state, second only to Fort St. Vrain Generating Station. The main water source is the South Platte River, being about 1000 feet away. Efforts have been made to reduce the amount of water consumed, most likely from evaporation in the cooling towers. It is mainly responsible for the power production of Denver and surrounding areas, as it is the only power station above 300 megawatts in the greater Denver area. The plant opened initially in 1968, and currently has a nameplate capacity of 928 megawatts. Xcel Energy, the operator of the plant, constructed the two combined cycle units in 2015, accounting for 569 megawatts. The remaining 352 megawatts have been generated by the existing unit. Prior to 2017, the plant was almost entirely powered by coal, however it made the shift to only natural gas that year. The change was primarily due to the Clean Air Act of 2010, which had the focus of reducing emissions from coal power plants. It uses two combined cycle units and one steam turbine. In 2020, Cherokee output a total of 3.8 billion kilowatt-hours, down from a spike of 4.6 billion in 2016.

References 

Buildings and structures in Adams County, Colorado
Natural gas-fired power stations in Colorado
Xcel Energy
Energy infrastructure completed in 1968